This is a partial list of products manufactured by the Gloucester Railway Carriage and Wagon Company:

Goods wagons

 Goods all-iron wagons 1862
 L-types cement wagons 1950s
 Pressure Discharge Bulk Powder Wagon ("Presflo") 1955-1963
 "Twin-Tub" Prestwin Silo wagons 1960-1962
 Cemflo Cement tanker wagon

Passenger coaches

 Steel welded carriages 1933

Diesel multiple units

British Rail Class 100 1956-1958
British Rail Class 119 1958
British Rail Class 122 1958
British Rail Class 128 1959

Electric multiple units

London Underground E Stock 1914
London Underground G Stock 1924-1925
London Underground O / P Stock 1937-1941
London Underground Q38 Stock 1938-1940
London Underground R38/1 & R38/2 Stock rebuilt 1948-1953
London Underground R47 Stock built 1949-1950
London Underground 1956 Stock 1957-1959
Melbourne (Australia) "Harris" trains 1956-1971
Toronto Subway  G-series built 1953-1959

Special orders

 Pioneer - an amphibious railcar used by Magnus Volk’s Brighton and Rottingdean Seashore Electric Railway 1894; scrapped 1910
 14 68 ft Palace on Wheels coaches (Rajasthan- Jaipur, Jodhpur, Jaisalmer, Bikaner, Alwar, Udaipur, Bundi, Kota, Jhalawar, Dungarpur, Dholpur, Bharatpur, Sirohi, and Kishangarh)- for Indian Maharajah 1936; now operated by Indian Railways as tourist train

Military

 Pivoting sections for the Mulberry Harbour for the British War Office 1944

References

Transport in Toronto
Rolling stock manufacturers of the United Kingdom
Defunct manufacturing companies of the United Kingdom
Gloucester Railway Carriage and Wagon Company
Companies based in Gloucester
products of the Gloucester Railway Carriage and Wagon Company